Dr Avraham Katznelson (1888 – 18 May 1956), later known as Avraham Nissan, was a physician and Zionist political figure in Mandate Palestine. He was a signatory of the Israeli declaration of independence.

Biography
Katznelson was born in 1888 in Babruysk in the Russian Empire (now in Belarus). He attended Saint Petersburg University and Moscow University. During World War I he served in the Russian Army as a physician. He emigrated to Mandatory Palestine in 1924.

A resident of Jerusalem, Katznelson became a member of the central committees of both Mapai and Hashomer Hatzair, representing the former in the Vaad Leumi and Moetzet HaAm from 1931 to 1948, and also serving as director of the health department of the Zionist Executive. As such, in 1948 he was amongst the signatories of Israel's declaration of independence, and was immediately co-opted into the Provisional State Council. He was also involved in the foundation of the radio station Kol Yisrael, which began broadcasting on the day independence was declared.

After independence he was appointed as an envoy to Scandinavia and later took a Hebrew surname, Nissan.

His sister Rachel Katznelson-Shazar was the wife of President Zalman Shazar, whilst he was the uncle of Shmuel Tamir.
His grandson Miko Peled is a peace activist.

References

1888 births
Soviet emigrants to Mandatory Palestine
Saint Petersburg State University alumni
Moscow State University alumni
Military doctors of the Russian Empire
Jews in Mandatory Palestine
Members of the Assembly of Representatives (Mandatory Palestine)
Signatories of the Israeli Declaration of Independence
20th-century Israeli physicians
Israeli diplomats
1956 deaths
Mapai politicians
People from Babruysk
People from Bobruysky Uyezd
Belarusian Jews
Jews from the Russian Empire
Israeli people of Belarusian-Jewish descent
Israeli healthcare managers
Jewish physicians
Israeli radio people